Arslan Shah I was Seljuk Sultan of Kerman from 1101–1142, a city in Iran situated at the center of Kerman province. Located in a large and flat plain, this city is placed 1,076 km (669 mi) south of the Iranian capital, Tehran.

Arslan Shah I succeeded his nephew Iran Shah (1096–1101) and was succeeded his son Mehmed I (Muhammad) (1142–1156).

References

 Boyle, J. A., Editor, The Cambridge History of Iran, Volume 5: The Saljuq and Mongol Periods, Cambridge University Press, 1968

1142 deaths
Seljuk rulers
People from Kerman
12th-century monarchs in Asia
12th-century Turkic people